Sun Naam Oruvar is a 2018 - 2019 Tamil talk show telecasted on Sun TV at 9:30 PM on every Sunday which aired from 7 October 2018 to 13 January 2019. The TV programme was presented by actor and TFPC President Vishal who eventually made his television debut through this show. The TV show is the remake of Telugu language language show Memu Saitham which was aired on Sun TV's subsidiary channel Gemini TV. The TV program is replaced by Namma Ooru Hero from 20 January 2019 which is hosted by Vijay Sethupathi.

Rules  
The celebrities who are part of the Tamil film industry (Kollywood) have to turn themselves into the concept of being common men and women among the society. They should help needy people by earning money through the course of the show and give that money that they earned to those people in order to achieve their dreams.

Guests included

References 

Sun TV original programming
Tamil-language talk shows
Tamil-language television shows
2010s Tamil-language television series
2018 Tamil-language television series debuts
2019 Tamil-language television series endings